BBC v Johns [1965] Ch 32 is a case in UK administrative law.

Facts
The BBC argued that it was exempt from income tax, claiming to be a monopoly established by royal prerogative.

Judgment
The court disagreed, ruling that is not possible to create new prerogative powers, and tax exemptions could only be granted by legislation.

The case is famous for the dictum of Lord Diplock who states that it is "350 years and a civil war too late for the Queen’s courts to broaden the royal prerogative".

See also
 R v Secretary of State for the Home Department, ex parte Northumbria Police Authority
 BBC v Harper Collins
 R (ProLife Alliance) v. BBC

External links
 http://swarb.co.uk/the-british-broadcasting-corporation-v-johns-hm-inspector-of-taxes-ca-5-mar-1964/

1965 in case law
United Kingdom administrative case law
Johns
1965 in British law
1965 in England